Caroline Johanna Lovisa Ridderstolpe, née Kolbe (September 2, 1793 – October 8, 1878) was a Swedish composer and singer.

Ridderstolpe was born in Berlin, the daughter of the chapel conductor, Carl Kolbe, and in 1816 married the Swedish governor, count Fredrik Ludvig Ridderstolpe. In 1832, she published the composition Sju Sånger (Seven Songs), dedicated to the Crown princess Josephine of Leuchtenberg. In 1834, Hvad är Glädjen? (What is Joy?) was published, dedicated to her late friend Josefina Benedicks, and in 1836 Nya Sånger (New Songs). Ridderstolpe was a student of Carl Maria von Weber.

Caroline Ridderstolpe was inducted as an honorary member of the Royal Swedish Academy of Music (chair 322) on March 26, 1850.

References 
 Wilhelmina Stålberg (in Swedish): Anteckningar om svenska qvinnor (Notes on Swedish women)
 Gustaf Hilleström: Kungl. Musikaliska Akademien, Matrikel 1771-1971

Further reading
 

1793 births
1878 deaths
19th-century classical composers
19th-century Swedish women musicians
Romantic composers
Swedish classical composers
Swedish countesses
Swedish women classical composers
19th-century women composers